The Bayer designation Eta Doradus (η Dor / η Doradus) is shared by two stars in the constellation Dorado:

 η Doradus
 η Doradus

Doradus, Eta
Dorado (constellation)